Marilyn Rice-Davies (21 October 1944 – 18 December 2014) was a Welsh model and showgirl best known for her association with Christine Keeler and her role in the Profumo affair, which discredited the Conservative government of British Prime Minister Harold Macmillan in 1963.

Early life
Marilyn Davies was born near Llanelli, Wales, and, during her childhood, moved to Solihull, Warwickshire. Her father was a policeman before becoming a technologist for Dunlop Rubber, and her mother was a former actress. She attended Sharmans Cross Secondary Modern School. As a teenager she worked at Woods Farm in Shirley assisting with the horse yard there. She appeared older than her age and at 15 she got a Saturday job as a clothes model at the Marshall & Snelgrove department store in Birmingham. At 16 she went to London as Miss Austin at the Earls Court Motor Show.

Profumo scandal
At Murray's Cabaret Club she met Christine Keeler, who introduced her to her friend, the well-connected osteopath Stephen Ward, and to an ex-lover, the slum landlord Peter Rachman. Rice-Davies became Rachman's mistress and was set up in the house in which he had previously kept Keeler, 1 Bryanston Mews West, Marylebone. Rice-Davies often visited Keeler at the house she shared with Ward at Wimpole Mews, Marylebone, and, after Keeler had moved elsewhere, lived there herself, between September and December 1962. On 14 December 1962, while Keeler was visiting Rice-Davies at Wimpole Mews, one of Keeler's boyfriends, John Edgecombe, attempted to enter and fired a gun several times at the door. His trial brought attention to the girls' involvement with Ward's social set, and intimacy with many powerful people, including Viscount Astor at whose stately home of Cliveden Keeler met the War Minister John Profumo. Profumo's brief relationship with Keeler was the centre of the affair that caused him to resign from the government in June 1963, though Rice-Davies herself never met him.

"Well he would, wouldn't he?"
Stephen Ward was found guilty of living on the earnings of prostitution (money obtained from Rice-Davies and Keeler among others); the trial having been instigated after the embarrassment caused to the government.

While being cross-examined at Ward's trial, Rice-Davies made a riposte which has since become famous. When James Burge, the defence counsel, pointed out that Lord Astor denied an affair or even having met her, she dismissed this, giggling "Well he would, wouldn't he?" (often misquoted "Well he would say that, wouldn't he?"). By 1979, this phrase had entered the third edition of the Oxford Dictionary of Quotations, and is occasionally referred to with the abbreviation MRDA ("Mandy Rice-Davies applies").  Astor was married at the time to Bronwen Astor, and decades later she too denied that there had been an affair between Rice-Davies and her husband, leading Rice-Davies to say that he had started it, not her.

Later life
A Private Eye cover at the time of Profumo had a photograph of "the lovely" Rice-Davies with the caption (without any headline or other identification), "Do you mind? If it wasn't for me – you couldn't have cared less about Rachman". Rice-Davies released a 45 EP on the Ember label (EMB EP 4537) in May 1964 entitled Introducing Mandy, which included cover versions of songs such as "All I Do Is Dream of You" and "You Got What It Takes".

Rice-Davies traded on the notoriety the trial brought her, comparing herself to Nelson's mistress, Lady Hamilton. In 1965 she was an associate of pre-fame David Bowie, attending his rehearsals and live performances. In 1966 she married an Israeli businessman, Rafi Shauli and moved to Israel. The couple had one daughter together and Rice-Davies converted to Judaism. She also opened nightclubs and restaurants in Tel Aviv. They were called Mandy's, Mandy's Candies and Mandy's Singing Bamboo.
In 1980, with Shirley Flack, Rice-Davies wrote her autobiography, Mandy. A year later she appeared in the Tom Stoppard play, Dirty Linen and New-Found-Land. In 1989, she wrote a novel entitled The Scarlet Thread. The Ottoman Empire provided the backdrop and the novel was described as a stirring wartime saga in the spirit of Gone with the Wind. Subsequently, journalist Libby Purves, who had met Rice-Davies when Mandy was published, invited her to join a female re-creation on the River Thames of Jerome K. Jerome's comic novel Three Men in a Boat. This expedition was commissioned by Alan Coren for the magazine Punch, the other members of the party being cartoonist Merrily Harpur and a toy Alsatian to represent Montmorency, the dog in the original story. Purves recounted how she "immediately spotted that this Rice-Davies was a woman to go up the Amazon with" and, among other things, that "only Mandy's foxy charm saved us from being evicted from a lock for being drunk on pink Champagne."

Rice-Davies appeared in a number of television and film productions, including Absolutely Fabulous and episode 6 of the first series of Chance in a Million. Her film career included roles in Nana, the True Key of Pleasure (1982), Black Venus (1983), and Absolute Beginners (1986) as the mother of Colin — whose father was played by Ray Davies from The Kinks. In the 1989 film Scandal, about the Profumo affair, Bridget Fonda portrayed Rice-Davies alongside Joanne Whalley as Keeler.

She was closely involved in the development of Andrew Lloyd Webber's musical Stephen Ward about Ward's involvement in the Profumo affair, in which she was portrayed by Charlotte Blackledge. The musical opened on 19 December 2013 at the Aldwych Theatre. On Radio 4's Midweek on 5 February 2014, Rice-Davies said of Stephen Ward, "I didn't fall for him, but I did have an affair with him." She once described her life as "one slow descent into respectability".

Rice-Davies is portrayed by Ellie Bamber in The Trial of Christine Keeler, a 2019–2020 six-part BBC One television series.

Death
Rice-Davies died, aged 70, from cancer on 18 December 2014 in London. She was survived by her third husband, millionaire waste management businessman Ken Foreman, and her daughter Dana.

References

External links
 1963 Denning Report - Parliament & the 1960s - UK Parliament Living Heritage

 
 BBC Radio 4 play about the Profumo affair, narrated by Mandy Rice-Davies

1944 births
2014 deaths
English expatriates in Israel
English restaurateurs
Women restaurateurs
Converts to Judaism
Deaths from cancer in England
Jewish English actresses
People from Llanelli
Welsh autobiographers
Welsh female models
Welsh film actresses
Welsh television actresses
Women autobiographers
Welsh expatriates in Israel
British restaurateurs
Jewish British actresses
English autobiographers
English female models
English film actresses
English television actresses
People from Solihull